Asura crocopepla is a moth of the family Erebidae. It is found in Australia.

References

crocopepla
Moths described in 1940
Moths of Australia